Robert J. Cobbs (born July 26, 1982, in Parsippany–Troy Hills, New Jersey) was an American football defensive back in the National Football League formerly for the New York Giants. He played college football at the University of Massachusetts Amherst where he was a standout playing running back, wide receiver and defensive back.  Cobbs was undrafted, but signed out of college with the Minnesota Vikings. Cobbs is a graduate of Parsippany Hills High School in Parsippany, New Jersey.

References

External links
NFL player profile

1982 births
Living people
Parsippany Hills High School alumni
People from Parsippany-Troy Hills, New Jersey
Players of American football from New Jersey
Sportspeople from Morris County, New Jersey
American football defensive backs
UMass Minutemen football players
New York Giants players